Pittosporum lancifolium, known as the narrow-leaved orange thorn or sticky orange thorn, is a shrub or tree growing in eastern Australia. Often found at altitudes above 500 metres above sea level; from Mallanganee National Park in New South Wales in the south to Yarraman in south east Queensland in the north.

Usually found in association with the Hoop Pine on the drier types of rainforest on soils enriched by basalt. The specific epithet lancifolium refers to the lance shaped leaves.

Description 
Usually a bush in the under-storey, however larger specimens can achieve a height of 25 metres and as stem diameter of 30 cm. When large, it is a crooked tree with a wide spreading crown.

The trunk is without buttresses, usually cylindrical in shape. Bark is grey or cream, scaly and with corky protuberances. Small branches are thin, with notable leaf scars.

Leaves are alternate on the stem, thin and without teeth, lanceolate or elliptical in shape, 2 to 5 cm long and 0.5 to 2 cm wide. Hairless and showing oil dots. The leaf stalk is 2 mm long. The leaf tip may be blunt or have a short prickle.

Sweet smelling yellow-green flowers form in ones or twos on short stalks from September to October. The fruit is a purple berry, with a hooked style at the top. 9 to 14 seeds grow within the sticky pulp. The globular fruit is 5 to 7 mm in diameter and it matures from March to August. Regeneration is from cuttings or fresh seeds.

References 

Apiales of Australia
Flora of New South Wales
Flora of Queensland
lancifolium
Taxa named by Frederick Manson Bailey